The Unthinkable is a 2018 Swedish thriller disaster war movie produced by Crazy Pictures, starring Christoffer Nordenrot, Lisa Henni, Jesper Barkselius and Pia Halvorsen. The film imagines a scenario in which Sweden is invaded during a rainy summer.

Plot 
In 2005, Alex lives in a village with his mother and his aggressive, unloving father Björn. His mother leaves the family, and Alex's closest friend Anna moves to Stockholm. Alex decides to leave his father and moves to a relative.

Ten years later, Alex lives in Stockholm and is now a famous pianist. During Midsummer, there are multiple explosions in Stockholm. Alex splits with his manager and decides to go back to his home village to buy the church piano he and Anna used to play on when they were younger. There, Alex meets Anna again who has moved back to the village. The attacks on Sweden worsen to include people recklessly driving and crashing cars in the rainy summer. The electricity and mobile networks are hit and become unavailable.

At the same time in Alex's home village, his father Björn fights off armed men from entering a restricted area with access to the electricity network. Civilians come there to seek safety in the bomb shelter, including Alex and Anna. They have contact with the military via radio and go to meet them in the village church. Helicopters shoot at them, but Björn takes down a helicopter from his airplane, saving Alex and Anna, however Björn's airplane crashes.

The film ends with a scene in the village church, which has been destroyed and is on fire. Alex stands in the rain facing Anna in the shelter of the church,  apparently having lost his recent memory due to the chemical weapons in the rain. Anna is taken away by the military. The very last clip of the film features Putin – suggesting that Russia was behind the attacks.

Cast 
 Christoffer Nordenrot - Alex
 Lisa Henni - Anna
  - Björn
  - Eva
 Magnus Sundberg - Konny
 Krister Kern - Kim
 Karin Bertling - Grandma
 Ulrika Bäckström - Klara
 Alexej Manvelov - Tholén
 Yngve Dahlberg - Emil
 Linda Kulle - Pettersson
 Håkan Ehn - Lasse 
 Tarmo Sakari Hietala - Berry picker
 Niklas Jarneheim - Uncle Erik
 Arvin Kananian - Sharokh
 Lo Lexfors - Elin
 Liselott Lindeborg - Lenny
 Rickard Lundqvist - Landers
 Carlos Paulsson - Policeman
 Rikard Svensson - Jögga
 Johan Wåhlin - Råsmark
 Eleonor Leone - Julia
 Erik Bolin - Incident commander
 Magdalena Eshaya - The beggar

Production

Financing 
The financing of the film started as a crowdfunded project on Kickstarter in 2015, where the project received 800,000 Swedish kronor ($100,000). After the initial crowdsourced funding, the film received more traditional funding, from SF Bio, Svenska Bio and others. The final budget for the film was 18.5 million Swedish kronor ($2.2 million).

Music 
Gustaf Spetz composed the soundtrack to the film. It features a version of the Swedish traditional summertime hymn Den blomstertid nu kommer, after which the film is named. The hymn is associated with summer and the film is set during Midsummer.

Release 
The film was released in Sweden on 20 June 2018, two days before Midsummer in Sweden, with the film itself being set during Midsummer. The Swedish title of the film is the name of a traditional hymn strongly associated with summer, Den blomstertid nu kommer.

During the first weekend after its release, The Unthinkable was the second most seen film in cinemas in Sweden. In March, 2019 the company announced that the film had been sold to 100 countries, making it one of Swedish film industry's biggest exports in 2018.

Reception

Critical response 

References

External links 
 
 Kickstarter campaign

2010s Swedish-language films
2018 films
2018 thriller films
Films about invasions
Fiction about invasions
Swedish thriller films
2010s Swedish films